Pomona was a goddess of fruitful abundance in ancient Roman religion and myth. Her name comes from the Latin word pomum, "fruit", specifically orchard fruit. 

Pomona was said to be a wood nymph.

Etymology 
The name Pōmōna is a derivation from Latin pōmus ('fruit-tree, fruit'), possibly stemming from Proto-Italic *po-e/omo ('taken off, picked?'), cognate with Umbrian Puemune, ultimately from Proto-Indo-European *h₁e/omo ('what is (to be) taken').

Mythology
In the myth narrated by Ovid, she scorned the love of the woodland gods Silvanus and Picus, but married Vertumnus after he tricked her, disguised as an old woman. She and Vertumnus shared a festival held on August 13. Her priest was called the flamen Pomonalis. The pruning knife was her attribute. There is a grove that is sacred to her called the Pomonal, located not far from Ostia, the ancient port of Rome.

Pomona was the goddess of fruit trees, gardens, and orchards. Unlike many other Roman goddesses and gods, she does not have a Greek counterpart, though she is commonly associated with Demeter. She watches over and protects fruit trees and cares for their cultivation. She was not actually associated with the harvest of fruits itself, but with the flourishing of the fruit trees. In artistic depictions she is generally shown with a platter of fruit or a cornucopia.

Namesakes
The city of Pomona, California, in Los Angeles County, is named after the goddess. Pomona College was founded in the city and retained its name even after relocating to its present-day location in Claremont.

The town of Pomona Park, Florida in Putnam County is named after the goddess of fruit from the time citrus horticulture dominated the economy of the area.

The Pomona Docks (formerly part of the Manchester docks) were built on the site of the Pomona Gardens.  A former public house nearby was named the Pomona Palace. 

32 Pomona is a main belt asteroid discovered in 1854.

In 2003 a newly discovered honey bee (Apis mellifera) subspecies was named after Pomona being called the Apis mellifera pomonella, it was discovered in the Tien Shan Mountains, an area with the greatest genetic diversity for a wild Malus species, M. sieversii, that is the predominant ancestor of domesticated apple varieties which are typically pollinated by honey bees on a commercial scale.

Representations in art
A bronze statue of Pomona sits atop the Pulitzer Fountain in Manhattan's Grand Army Plaza in New York. The fountain was funded by newspaper tycoon Joseph Pulitzer, designed by the architect Thomas Hastings, and crowned by a statue conceived by the sculptor Karl Bitter. The fountain was dedicated in May 1916.

Pomona is briefly mentioned in C. S. Lewis's children's book Prince Caspian.

Der Sieg der fruchtbaren Pomona ("The Victory of Fruitful Pomona") is a 1702 opera by Reinhard Keiser.

Pomona is the title of a play by Alistair McDowell, commissioned in 2014 for the Royal Welsh College of Music and Drama.

Pomona briefly appears in Rick Riordan's fantasy novel The Last Olympian, in which she expresses sympathy toward those rebelling against the rule of Jupiter.

Pomona Sprout is professor of Herbology (magical botany) in the Harry Potter novels.

Pomona is one of three statues featured at the Massachusetts Horticulture Society's Elm Bank Horticulture Center, along with Ceres and Flora.

Gallery

See also
 Karpo, one of the Horae.
 Leucothoe, who was similarly seduced.
 The ballet Pomona, with music by Constant Lambert, choreography by Frederick Ashton and scenery and costumes by Vanessa Bell, was first performed by the Vic-Wells Ballet at the Sadler's Wells Theatre on 17 January 1933.

References

Bibliography

External links

 

Agricultural goddesses
Dryads
Roman goddesses
Personifications in Roman mythology